Uruguay competed at the 2011 Pan American Games in Guadalajara, Mexico from October 14 to 30, 2011. Uruguay sent 113 athletes in over sports.

Medalists

Athletics

Men
Track and road events

Field events

Women
Track and road events

Field events

Basketball

Men

Team

Emiliano Baston
Nicolas Borsellino
Hernando Caceres
Bruno Fitipaldo
Federico Haller
Ican Loriente
Reque Newsome
Joaquin Osimani
Martin Osimani
Juan Pablo Silveira
Sebastian Vazquez
Santiago Vidal

Standings

Results

Seventh Place Match

Basque pelota

Uruguay qualified two athletes each in the paleta rubber pairs trinkete, paleta leather pairs trinkete, paleta leather pairs 36m fronton, paleta leather pairs 30m fronton, and the women's paleta rubber pairs trinkete categories.

Men

Women

Beach volleyball

Uruguay qualified a men's and women's team in the beach volleyball competition.

Equestrian

Eventing

Jumping
Individual

Team

Football

Uruguay qualified a men's team in the football competition.

Men

Matías Cubero
Guillermo de los Santos
Gastón Silva
Adrián Gunino
Facundo Píriz
Mauricio Prieto
Leonardo Pais
Gonzalo Papa
Federico Puppo
Tabaré Viudez
Maxi Rodríguez
Martín Sebastian Rodríguez
Santiago Silva
Emiliano Albín
Diego Martín Rodríguez
Mathias Abero
Gianni Rodríguez
Matías Britos

Men's team will participate in Group A of the football tournament.

Semifinals

Bronze Medal match

Judo

Uruguay qualified one athlete in the 73 kg men's category.

Men

Repechage Rounds

Karate

Uruguay qualified one athlete in the 84 kg men's category.

Modern pentathlon

Uruguay qualified one male pentathlete.

Men

Roller skating

Women

Artistic

Rowing

Men

Rugby sevens

Uruguay qualified a team to participate in rugby sevens. It consisted of 12 athletes.

Team

Jose Albanell
Santiago Arocena
Felipe Berchesi
Sebastian Cuello
Ezequiel Espiga
Federico Favaro
Juan Martin Llovet
Manuel Martinez
Rodrigo Martinez
Agustín Ormaechea
Alejo Parra
Alberto Román

Quarterfinals

Semifinals

Bronze medal match

Sailing

Uruguay qualified three boats and four athletes in the sailing competition.

Men

Women

Open

Shooting

Men

Women

Synchronized swimming

Uruguay qualified a pair of athletes in the duet synchronized swimming competition.

Swimming

Men

Women

Taekwondo

Uruguay qualified one athlete in the 58 kg men's category.

Men

Tennis

Men

Triathlon
American

Men

Women

Weightlifting

References

Nations at the 2011 Pan American Games
P
2011